Valeria Gastaldi (born December 5, 1981) is an Argentine singer, and also a member of the pop group Bandana.

Gastaldi was born in Buenos Aires, Argentina. She started singing early in life, and later studied in Stella Adler Studio of Acting in New York.

Her life in professional music began when she was selected through reality TV show Popstars to form an all female pop group, later to be named Bandana.

The group released three studio albums, though would dissolve in 2004. In 2007, she released a solo album through Universal Music Latino, Cuando No Estas.

External links
 Billboard biography
Valeria Gastaldi, Artista Destacado - Billboard En Español

References 

1981 births
Living people
20th-century Argentine women singers
Argentine people of Italian descent
Argentine pop singers
Singers from Buenos Aires
Popstars winners
Bandana (pop band) members